Expert Review of Anticancer Therapy is a monthly peer-reviewed medical journal covering all clinical aspects of cancer therapy. It was established in 2001 and is published by Taylor & Francis under the academic publishing division of Informa. The current Editor-in-Chief is Gertjan J L Kaspers who is Head of Pediatric Oncology at VU University Medical Center Amsterdam. According to Journal Citation Reports, the journal has a 2020 impact factor of 4.512 and a 2020 CiteScore of 6.4.

References

External links 
 

Oncology journals
Cancer treatments
English-language journals
Expert Review journals
Monthly journals
Publications established in 2001